Walter Faller (11 November 1909 – 3 February 2003) was a German politician of the Social Democratic Party (SPD) and member of the German Bundestag.

Life 
Faller was a member of the Bundestag from 4 December 1951, when he succeeded Gustav Herbig as ambassador, until 1972. He entered parliament via his party's state list for Baden-Württemberg in all federal elections between 1953 and 1969. He was also a member of the European Parliament from 29 November 1961 to 14 February 1973.

Literature

References

1909 births
2003 deaths
Members of the Bundestag 1969–1972
Members of the Bundestag 1965–1969
Members of the Bundestag 1961–1965
Members of the Bundestag 1957–1961
Members of the Bundestag 1953–1957
Members of the Bundestag 1949–1953
Members of the Bundestag for the Social Democratic Party of Germany
Social Democratic Party of Germany MEPs
MEPs for Germany 1958–1979